The 2021 Alsco Uniforms 300 was a NASCAR Xfinity Series race held on May 29, 2021. It was contested over 200 laps on the  asphalt speedway. It was the eleventh race of the 2021 NASCAR Xfinity Series season. Joe Gibbs Racing driver Ty Gibbs, collected his second win of the season, and his career.

Report

Background
The race was held at Charlotte Motor Speedway, located in Concord, North Carolina. The speedway complex includes a  quad-oval track that was utilized for the race, as well as a dragstrip and a dirt track. The speedway was built in 1959 by Bruton Smith and is considered the home track for NASCAR with many race teams based in the Charlotte metropolitan area. The track is owned and operated by Speedway Motorsports Inc. (SMI) with Marcus G. Smith serving as track president.

Entry list 

 (R) denotes rookie driver.
 (i) denotes driver who is ineligible for series driver points.

Practice 

Qualifying

Qualifying results

Race

Race results

Stage Results 
Stage One
Laps: 45

Stage Two
Laps: 45

Final Stage Results 

Laps: 110

Race statistics 

 Lead changes: 12 among 7 different drivers
 Cautions/Laps: 10 for 51
 Time of race: 2 hours, 39 minutes, and 57 seconds
 Average speed:

References 

NASCAR races at Charlotte Motor Speedway
2021 in sports in North Carolina
Alsco Uniforms 300
2021 NASCAR Xfinity Series